Giovanni Battista Franzoni (8 November 1928 – 13 July 2017) was an Italian Christian communist and dissident theologian. A former Benedictine, he was Abbot of St. Paul's Outside the Walls from 1964 to 1973. Having become involved in activism and politics, he was laicized by Pope Paul VI in 1976.

Biography
Franzoni was an Italian born in Varna, Bulgaria. He professed as a member of the Order of Saint Benedict (OSB) on 5 July 1951. He was ordained to the priesthood on 25 January 1955, began his work as a priest in Florence, Italy.  He was the author of numerous theological works.

An abbot at St. Paul's Outside the Walls, one of the most popular churches in Rome, he was defrocked by Pope Paul VI, with whom he had feuded over theology, during the Cold War, after he had announced his intention to vote for the Italian Communist Party in 1976 Italian general election, which Franzoni had joined in June of that year.

Franzoni was a longtime peace activist, having stood against the United States' armed involvements in Vietnam and Iraq.

Franzoni opposed the initiated beatification process for Pope John Paul II. In 2005, Franzoni joined ten other theologians to appeal to Catholics critical of the canonization process to voice their concerns.

At the time of his death Franzoni was no longer a member of the Catholic priesthood. He was married to a Japanese pedagogist.

Works
In Italian:

 La terra è di Dio (1973)
 Omelie a S. Paolo fuori le mura (1974)
 Il posto della fede (1977)
 Il diavolo mio fratello (1986)
 Le tentazioni di Cristo (1990)
 La solitudine del samaritano (1993)
 Farete riposare la terra (1996)
 Giobbe, l'ultima tentazione (1998)
 Lo strappo nel cielo di carta (1999)
 Anche il cielo è di Dio (2000)
 Ofelia e le altre (2001)
 La morte condivisa (2002)
 Del rigore e della misericordia (2005)

References

1928 births
2017 deaths
20th-century Italian politicians
20th-century Italian Roman Catholic theologians
Anti–Iraq War activists
Anti–Vietnam War activists
Catholic socialists
Christian communists
Christian socialist theologians
Italian anti-war activists
Italian Benedictines
Italian Christian socialists
Italian Communist Party politicians
21st-century Italian Roman Catholic theologians
Laicized Roman Catholic priests
People from Varna, Bulgaria
Italian expatriates in Bulgaria